is a Japanese television drama series. It first aired from 30 September 2013 to 29 March 2014. It is scripted by Yoshiko Morishita, who wrote such dramas as Jin, and stars Anne Watanabe as Meiko Uno, a woman who lives through the Taisho and Shōwa eras and tries to excel at Japanese cuisine. Meiko is the daughter of parents who run a western style restaurant in Tokyo. She marries, moves to Osaka with her husband, and experiences cultural differences between Tokyo and Osaka, as she lives as a mother and wife in Osaka. It is the 89th NHK Asadora.

The word gochisōsan is an informal version of gochisōsama, a term used to thank a host or a cook for a meal.

Cast

Main characters 
Anne Watanabe as Meiko Nishikado (her maiden name was Uno)
Hana Toyoshima as young Meiko Uno
Masahiro Higashide as Yūtarō Nishikado, Meiko's husband
Ryūnosuke Hosoda as young Yūtarō Nishikado
Miyabi Matsuura as Fuku Nishikado, Meiko's daughter
Tomoka Harami as young Fuku Nishikado
 Masaki Suda as Taisuke Nishikado, Meiko's son
 Ryūto Misawa as young Taisuke Nishikado
 Daigo Nishihata as Katsuo Nishikado, Meiko's son
 Teruo Ninomiya as young Katsuo Nishikado

Uno family 
Kazuko Yoshiyuki as Tora Uno, Meiko's grandmother (also as narrator)
Naomi Zaizen as Iku Uno, Meiko's mother
Taizō Harada as Daigo Uno, Meiko's father
Kai Inowaki as Teruo Uno, Meiko's brother
Chiemi Matsutera as Kuma

Nishikado family 
 Masaomi Kondō as Shōzō Nishikado, Yutaro's father
 Masahiro Kobori as young Shōzo Nishikado
 Yoshiko Miyazaki as Shizu Nishikado
 Saki Furuwa as young Shizu Nishikado
 Midoriko Kimura as Kazue Yamashita (her maiden name was Nishikado), Yutaro's older sister
 Mitsuki Takahata as Noriko Kawakubo (her maiden name was Nishikado), Yutaro's younger sister and Keiji's wife
 Yura Arata as young Noriko Nishikado

Others 
Yasuhi Nakamura as Umasuke Takagi
Takashi Yamanaka as Kosai Muroi, Sakurako's husband and Meiko's friend
Aki Maeda as Sakurako Muroi (her maiden name was Horinohata), Kosai's wife
Abe Yohana as Ayame Muroi, Kosai and Sakurako's eldest daughter
Akira Sugimoto as young Ayame Muroi
Akiko Kimata as Tatsuko Takagi, Umasuke's sister
Mai Miyajima as Tamiko Nogawa, Meiko's friend
Kaoru Okumeki as Mrs. Miyamoto
Masato Wada as Genta Izumi, Meiko's childhood friend
Ai Kato as Akiko Matsuda
Kotoko Noda as young Akiko Matsuda
Ippei Shigeyama as Keiji Kawakubo, Noriko's husband
Henry Fowler as Kansai ben-speaking GHQ interpreter

International broadcast
Indonesia, Myanmar, Singapore, Thailand, Taiwan, Sri Lanka, Mongolia and Vietnam: It was aired every Monday to Saturday on WakuWaku Japan under the title Bon Appetit!. 
It was also broadcast in Malaysia through TV Alhijrah.
The broadcast rights for the drama were sold to Sri Lanka with the intention of dubbing it into Sinhalese.
Jamaica: It premiered on CVM Television in 2017.
Thailand: It was aired every Saturday to Sunday on Thai PBS under the title "Bon Appetit! ยอดหญิงยอดเชฟ"
Iran: It was aired every night on Tamasha TV under the title "Bon Appetit (نوش جان)"

References

External links

2013 Japanese television series debuts
2014 Japanese television series endings
Asadora
Television series set in restaurants
Television shows set in Osaka